Trichodezia haberhaueri is a moth in the family Geometridae. It is found in Russia (the Russian plain and the Caucasus), Georgia and Turkey.

References

Moths described in 1864
Cidariini
Insects of Turkey